Dogri (Devanagari: डोगरी;) is an Indo-Aryan language primarily spoken in the Jammu region of Jammu and Kashmir, India, with smaller groups of speakers in adjoining regions of western Himachal Pradesh, northern Punjab, and north-eastern Pakistani Punjab. It is the ethnic language of the Dogras, and was spoken in the historical region of Greater Duggar. Currently in Districts : Kathua, Jammu, Samba, Udhampur, and Reasi, it is a majority language. Dogri is a member of the Western Pahari group of languages. Unusually for an Indo-European language, Dogri is tonal, a trait it shares with other Western Pahari languages and Punjabi. It has several varieties, all with greater than 80% lexical similarity (within Jammu and Kashmir).

Dogri is spoken by 2.6 million people in India (as of the 2011 census). It has been among the country's 22 scheduled languages since 2003. It is also one of the 5 official languages of the union territory of Jammu and Kashmir.

Script
Dogri was originally written in the old Dogra Akkhar script – a modified version of Takri. A modified version of this script was created by the order of Maharaja Ranbir Singh of Jammu and Kashmir, which was then called Name Dogra Akkhar. Official documents were written in this new script; however it never caught on among the general Dogri-speaking populace. Currently, Devanagari is the officially recognised script for Dogri in India and virtually all Dogri literature is published in it.

Phonology

Consonants 

 Gemination occurs in all consonants except the consonants //.
Retroflex consonants // rarely occur in word initial position.
// only occur from Perso-Arabic loan words. // is also heard as an allophone of //.
// can also marginally be heard as trilled [] in some speech.
 In some words, // can become more weakly pronounced, or even eliminated and replaced by a glottal fricative sound [].
A palatal nasal sound [] typically occurs when a dental nasal precedes a post-alveolar affricate consonant, rarely occurring in words word-initially or medially.
 A velar nasal sound [] typically occurs when a dental nasal precedes a velar plosive consonant, and rarely occurs word-initially or medially.

Vowels 

 There are nasalized variations of the following vowels //.
Vowel sounds are often nasalized when occurring before a word-medial or word-final //, except when // occurs before a word-final vowel.
// can have a marginal upgliding allophone [] when occurring before a /a/ vowel sound.
A word-final // is realized as a back sound [] and may also drift toward a centralized [] sound.

Some common words

Tone rules 
These are rules of writing tones in Dogri using Devanagari Script. They are as follows:-

 Just like Punjabi, Dogri also uses the letters घ (gʱə), झ (d͡ʒʱə), ढ (ɖʱə), ध (d̪ʱə), भ (bʱə) and ढ़ (ɽʱə) for tonal uses. When at the beginning of the word, it has a high-falling tone; i.e.:- घ (kə̀), झ (t͡ʃə̀), ढ (ʈə̀), ध (t̪ə̀), भ (pə̀) and ढ़ (ɽə̀). When in the middle and final position of the word, the preceding vowel has a low-rising tone; i.e.:- अघ (ə́ɡ), अझ (ə́d͡ʒ), अढ (ə́ɖ), अध (ə́d̪), अभ (ə́b) and अढ़ (ə́ɽ). Examples:- घड़ी (kə̀ɽiː)- clock, and बध (bə́d̪).
 Unlike Punjabi, there is no ह (ɦə) sound and it has a high-falling tone in all positions; i.e.:- हत्थ (ə̀t̪ːʰə)- hand.
 To indicate a low-rising tone in the middle of words, Dogri uses ह् (ह with a halant) to indicate it when the preceding vowel is long; i.e.:- आ (aː), ई (iː), ऊ (uː), ए (eː), ऐ (ɛː), ओ (oː) and औ (ɔː). Example:- साह्ब (sáːb)- sahab. When the preceding vowel is short, i.e., - अ (ə), इ (ɪ) and उ (ʊ); an apostrophe mark (') is used. Example:- ल'त्त (lə́tː)- leg.
The characters mentioned in the first point can also be used to indicate high-falling tone in the middle of the words when between a short vowel and a long vowel.

Some examples are shown below.

Historical references
In the year 1317, Amir Khusro, the famous Urdu and Persian poet, referred to Duger (Dogri) while describing the languages and dialects of India as follows: "Sindhi-o-Lahori-o-Kashmiri-o-Duger."

Theories on name origin
Intellectuals in the court of Maharaja Ranbir Singh of Jammu and Kashmir described Duggar as a distorted form of the word Dwigarta, which means 'two troughs', a possible reference to the Mansar and Surinsar lakes.

The linguist George Grierson connected the term Duggar with the Rajasthani word Doonger which means 'hill', and Dogra with Donger. This opinion has lacked support because of the inconsistency of the ostensible changes from Rajasthani to Dogri (essentially the question of how Doonger became Duggar while Donger became Dogra), and has been contradicted by some scholars.

Yet another proposal stems from the word Durgara, the name of a kingdom mentioned in an eleventh century copper-plate inscription in the Bhuri Singh Museum in Chamba, Himachal Pradesh. The word Durgara means 'invincible' in several Northern Indo-Aryan languages, and could be an allusion to the ruggedness of the terrain of Duggar and the historically militarised and autonomous Dogra societies. 

In 1976, the experts attending the Language Session of the All India Oriental Conference held in Dharwad, Karnataka, could not reach consensus on the Dwigarta and Durgara hypotheses, but did manage agreement on a Doonger-Duggar connection. In a subsequent All India Oriental Conference held at Jaipur in 1982, the linguists agreed that the culture, language and history of Rajasthan and Duggar share some similarities. It was also suggested that the words Duggar and Dogra are common in some parts of Rajasthan. Specifically, it was asserted that areas with many forts are called Duggar, and their inhabitants are accordingly known as Dogras. The land of Duggar also has many forts, which may support the above opinion.

An article by Dharam Chand Prashant in the literary magazine Shiraza Dogri suggested that "the opinion that the word Duggar is a form of the word Duggarh sounds appropriate."

Recent history

In modern times, a notable Dogri translation (in the New Dogra script) of the Sanskrit classic mathematical opus Lilavati, by the noted mathematician Bhaskaracharya (b. 1114 AD), was published by the Vidya Vilas Press, Jammu in 1873. As Sanskrit literacy remained confined to a few, the late Maharaja Ranbir Singh had the Lilavati translated into Dogri by Jyotshi Bisheshwar, then principal of Jammu Pathshala.

Dogri has an established tradition of poetry, fiction and dramatic works. Recent poets range from the 18th-century Dogri poet Kavi Dattu (1725–1780) in Raja Ranjit Dev's court to Professor Ram Nath Shastri and Mrs. Padma Sachdev. Kavi Dattu is highly regarded for his Barah Massa (Twelve Months), Kamal Netra (Lotus Eyes), Bhup Bijog and Bir Bilas. Shiraza Dogri is a Dogri literary periodical issued by the Jammu and Kashmir Academy of Art, Culture and Languages, which is a notable publisher of modern Dogri literary work, another being the Dogri Sanstha. Popular recent songs include Pala Shapaiya Dogariya, Manne di Mauj and Shhori Deya. The noted Pakistani singer Malika Pukhraj had roots in Duggar, and her renditions of several Dogri songs continue to be popular in the region. Some devotional songs (bhajans) composed by Karan Singh have gained increasing popularity over time, including Kaun Kareyaan Teri Aarti.

Dogri programming features regularly on Radio Kashmir (a division of All India Radio), and Doordarshan (Indian state television) broadcasts in Jammu and Kashmir. However, Dogri does not have a dedicated state television channel yet, unlike Kashmiri (which has the Doordarshan Koshur channel, available on cable and satellite television throughout India).

Official recognition of the language has been gradual, but progressive. On 2 August 1969, the General Council of the Sahitya Academy, Delhi recognized Dogri as an "independent modern literary language" of India, based on the unanimous recommendation of a panel of linguists. Dogri is one of the official languages of the Indian union territory of Jammu and Kashmir. On 22 December 2003, in a major milestone for the official status of the language, Dogri was recognized as a national language of India in the Indian constitution.

In 2005, a collection of over 100 works of prose and poetry in Dogri published over the last 50 years was made accessible online at the Central Institute of Indian Languages (CIIL), Mysore. This included works of eminent writer Dhinu Bhai Panth, Professor Madan Mohan Sharma, B.P. Sathai and Ram Nath Shastri.

Sample text 
The following text is from Article 1 of the Universal Declaration of Human Rights.

See also
 Name Dogra Akkhar
Western Pahari languages
Dogras
Duggar
 List of Sahitya Akademi Award winners for Dogri
 Dogri cinema
 Languages of India

References

Bibliography
 Gopal Haldar (2000). Languages of India.  New Delhi: National Book Trust

External links

 The Dogri Language, article by Ved Kumari Ghai
 Duggar Times.com, for more on Dogri language, literature and writers
 Dailyexcelsior.com, "One Hundredth Amendment," news report on the recognition of Dogri as a national language.
 Modifications to Devanagri to represent Dogri tones
 Pahari.org, Alami Pahari Adabi Sangat (Global Pahari Cultural Association)
 Ancientscripts.com, The Takri script.
 Crulp.org, paper on tonality and intonation in Punjabi.
 Dogri computing resources at TDIL (Devanagari Script)

 
Northern Indo-Aryan languages
Languages of Punjab, Pakistan
Official languages of India
Languages of Jammu and Kashmir
Languages officially written in Indic scripts
Jammu Division
Arabic alphabets for South Asian languages
Sahitya Akademi recognised languages
Tonal languages in non-tonal families